The José Amalfitani Stadium is a stadium located in the Liniers neighborhood of Buenos Aires, Argentina, near Liniers railway station. The venue is the home of the Argentine Primera División club Vélez Sarsfield and is also known as El Fortín de Liniers or Vélez Sarsfield. The stadium was named after José Amalfitani, who was president of Vélez Sarsfield for 30 years.

The original, temporary stadium was built between 1941 and 1943 in wood, and the current facility was built in cement between 1947 and 1951. It was renovated and enlarged 26 years later in preparation for the 1978 FIFA World Cup. The stadium has a capacity of 49,540 spectators, although it does not provide seating for all of them like most Argentine stadia.

The Estadio José Amalfitani is also the national stadium for the Argentina national rugby union team (Los Pumas). Although the team plays test matches throughout the country, their highest-profile tests (such as against the New Zealand All Blacks) are usually held here. The Jaguares, a team in the Super Rugby league since 2016, plays its home games at the stadium.

History

Predecessors 

During its first years of existence, Vélez Sarsfield football team played its games in vacant lands of the neighborhood, with removable goal posts. In 1913 the Argentine Football Association ordered the club to host its home games at a bigger stadium so the club moved to the Juan Martín Figallo's (a neighbor) countryhouse on Rodó and Escalada streets. Figallo rented the club part of his land.

In 1914, the club called an assembly to discuss the possibility to rent lands on better places. The club got a land behind Villa Luro station, between Cortina and Bacacay streets. But the definitive stadium would be built in 1922, when the club rented a land to López Bancalari Brothers on Guardia Nacional street. The club started to built a grandstand while the team continued playing in Villa Luro and other fields, until the construction finished. Works were ready in 1924, when the club inaugurated its first stadium with a grandstand, lockers, coffee shop, personnel room and secretary. The stadium was officially opened in a friendly match v River Plate.

New grandstands were built between 1926 and 1927, completing the four sides of the stadium and therefore increasing its capacity. In 1935, the first match with artificial lighting was played at Vélez Sarsfield venue. The local team defeated Platense 4–2. The end of an era came in 1940 when the club was intimated to leave the lands where the stadium was located due to the rental contract had expired.

Current venue

After suffering relegation from the Argentine Primera División in 1940, Vélez was sacked from the Villa Luro ground they were renting. Three years later, in 1941, the club obtained the terrain of the current stadium, property of the Buenos Aires Western Railway. The ground was a swamp of the Maldonado Stream, where construction was difficult. However, the club's president José Amalfitani led the construction of the first stadium at the site, which was inaugurated on April 11, 1943. The new stadium used the same wood stands from the old Villa Luro stadium, and was inaugurated in a 2–2 draw with River Plate. Vélez striker Juan José Ferraro scored the first goal in the stadium's history (the others were scored by Ángel Fernández for Vélez and Adolfo Pedernera twice for River). The current stadium was inaugurated on April 22, 1951.

The stadium was renamed in honor of José Amalfitani on December 7, 1968. The following year, a modern lighting system by Siemens was installed, and the first of the upper stand sections was completed.

Events hosted

Football

1978 FIFA World Cup

The stadium was refurbished for the 1978 FIFA World Cup with the completion of press boxes and another section of upper stands, and hosted three games in the group stages.

Argentina friendly matches

Rugby union 
The José Amalfitani Stadium is the current home ground for the Jaguares, an Argentine Super Rugby franchise. The ground has  also hosted the Argentina national team (Los Pumas) since 1986, when the side left to play at Ferro Carril Oeste Stadium (their home venue by then) searching for higher capacity stadiums.

When South Africa played Argentina in November 2005 at Vélez Sarsfield, they faced a strong Pumas side, which took a 20–16 lead into the half-time break, before fading in the second half and losing 34–23.

In the 2006 mid-year tests, the second test against Wales, saw the Pumas win 45–27, Argentina's largest win ever over Wales. The national squad next hosted the world's top team, the All Blacks. The New Zealanders survived an Argentine assault in the final minutes to hang on to win 25–19 and to deny Argentina a huge upset.

Los Pumas began their final preparation for the 2007 World Cup with a summer two-test series against visiting Ireland, including a 16–0 win at Vélez Sarsfield.

Argentina test matches

Concerts

The stadium has hosted many international concerts since the 1980s. English rock band Queen was the first to perform at Vélez Sarsfield –giving three concerts in February 1981– as part of The Game Tour to support their successful homonymous album. The visit of the band (which was at the peak of their career by then) had huge repercussions in Argentina, being widely covered by the media, and famous personalities –such as Diego Maradona– attending to their concerts.

José Amalfitani Stadium hosts events of up to 50,000 spectators.

See also

List of association football stadiums by capacity

References

External links

 

José Amalfitani Stadium
Sports venues in Buenos Aires
Sports venues completed in 1951
1978 FIFA World Cup stadiums
Football venues in Buenos Aires
Argentina national rugby union team
Rugby union stadiums in Argentina
Copa América stadiums